Lucky to Be Alive may refer to:

Lucky to Be Alive (Braid album), 2000
Lucky to Be Alive (Confederate Railroad album), 2016